The Fishers of Darksea is a novel by Roger Eldridge published in 1982.

Plot summary
The Fishers of Darksea is a novel in which a native Fisher on the remote island of Darksea finds an odd device.

Reception
Dave Langford reviewed The Fishers of Darksea for White Dwarf #59, and stated that "A truly consistent and well-imagined 'alien' society."

Reviews
Review by Judith Hanna (1983) in Foundation, #29 November 1983

References

1982 novels